The Ice Hockey Federation of the Kyrgyz Republic is the governing body of ice hockey in Kyrgyzstan.

References

 
Kyrgyzstan
Ice hockey in Kyrgyzstan
Kyrgyzstan
Ice hockey